Gerry Hemingway (born March 23, 1955) is an American drummer and composer.

Hemingway was a member of the Anthony Braxton quartet from 1983 to 1994. He has also performed with Ernst Reijseger, Anthony Davis, Earl Howard, Leo Smith, George E. Lewis, Ray Anderson, Mark Helias, Reggie Workman, Michael Moore, Oliver Lake, Marilyn Crispell, Christy Doran, John Wolf Brennan, Don Byron, Cecil Taylor, and Cuong Vu.

Hemingway received a Guggenheim Fellowship for his work in music composition in 2000, and was a student of Alan Dawson. He is a graduate of Foote School in New Haven. He has recorded on over one hundred albums for the labels Clean Feed, Enja, hatArt, Palmetto, Random Acoustics, and Tzadik. He owns his own label, Auricle.

Discography

As leader
 1979 Kwambe Auricle
 1982 Solo Works (solo) Auricle
 1983–94 Electro-Acoustic Solo Works (solo) Random Acoustics 1996
 1984–95 Electro-Acoustic Solo Works (solo) Random Acoustics 1996
 1987 Outer Bridge Crossing (quintet) Sound Aspects
 1988 Tub Works (solo) Sound Aspects
 1991 Down to the Wire (quartet) hatArt
 1991 View from Points West  (trio w G Graewe, E Reijseger) Music & Arts
 1991 Special Detail (quintet) hatArt
 1991-94 Slamadam (quintet) Random Acoustics 1995
 1993 Demon Chaser(quintet) hatArt, 
 1994 Saturn Cycle (trio w G Graewe, E Reijseger) Music & Arts
 1995 The Marmalade King (quintet) hatArt
 1996 Perfect World (quintet)  Random Acoustics
 1998 Johnny's Corner Song (quartet) Auricle
 1999 Waltzes, Two–Steps & other Matters of the Heart (quintet) GM  
 1999 Chamber Works Tzadik
 2002 Songs Between the Lines
 2002 Double Blues Crossing (quintet) Between the Lines
 2003 Devil's Paradise (quartet) Clean Feed
2005 The Whimbler (quartet) Clean Feed
2011 Riptide (quintet) Clean Feed

As co-leader 
With Bass-Drum-Bone (Mark Helias, Gerry Hemingway, Ray Anderson)

 1978 Oahspe (Auricle)
 1980 Right Down Your Alley (Black Saint) (under Ray Anderson name)
 1986 You Be (Minor Music)
 1986-96 Cooked To Perfection (Auricle, 1999)
 1989 Wooferlo (Soul Note)
 1997 March Of Dimes (Data)
 1997 Hence The Reason (Enja)
 2005 The Line Up (Clean Feed Records)
 2009 The Other Parade (Clean Feed Records, 2011)
 2016 The Long Road (Auricle)
With WHO trio  (Michel Wintsch, Gerry Hemingway, Bänz Oester)

1999 Identity (Leo Recs)
2004 The Current Underneath (Leo Recs)
2009 Less Is More (Clean Feed Records)
2014 The WHO Zoo (Auricle) (2xCD)
2020 Strell (Clean Feed Records)

As sideman 
With Anthony Braxton
 Four Compositions (Quartet) 1983 (Black Saint, 1983)
 Six Compositions (Quartet) 1984 (Black Saint, 1984)
 Prag 1984 (Quartet Performance) (Sound Aspects, 1984 [1990])
 Quartet (London) 1985 (Leo, 1985 [1988])
 Quartet (Birmingham) 1985 (Leo, 1985 [1991])
 Quartet (Coventry) 1985 (Leo, 1985)
 Five Compositions (Quartet) 1986 (Black Saint, 1986)
 Ensemble (Victoriaville) 1988 (Victo, 1989 [1992])
 Willisau (Quartet) 1991 (hatArt, 1992)
 (Victoriaville) 1992 (Victo, 1993)
 Twelve Compositions (Music & Arts, 1993)
 Quartet (Santa Cruz) 1993 (hatART, 1997)
 Old Dogs (Mode, 2007)

With Samuel Blaser
 A Mirror to Machaut (Blaser Music, 2013)
 Fourth Landscape (Nuscope, 2013)
 Oostum (NoBusiness Records, 2018)
 Early in the Mornin (OutNote Records, 2018)
 Moods (Blaser Music, 2021)

With Marilyn Crispell
 The Kitchen Concert (Leo, 1991)
 Circles (Les Disques Victo, 1991)
 Santuerio (Leo, 1993)
 Highlights from the Summer of 1992 American Tour (Music & Arts, 1993)
 Cascades (Music & Arts, 1996)
 MGM Trio (Ramboy, 1996) with Michael Moore
 Affinities (Intakt, 2011)
 Marilyn Crispell, Mark Dresser, Gerry Hemingway Play Braxton (Tzadik, 2012)
 Table of Changes (Intakt, 2015)

With Maybe Monday
 Unsquare (Intakt, 2008)

With Reggie Workman
 Images (Music & Arts, 1990)
 Altered Spaces (Leo, 1993)
 Cerebral Caverns (Postcards Records, 1995)

References

External links
 Gerry Hemingway official site

1955 births
Songwriters from Connecticut
American jazz drummers
Living people
Musicians from New Haven, Connecticut
Tzadik Records artists
Songwriters from New York (state)
20th-century American drummers
American male drummers
Jazz musicians from Connecticut
20th-century American male musicians
American male jazz musicians
Clean Feed Records artists
Music & Arts artists
Intakt Records artists
American male songwriters
NoBusiness Records artists